Cheshmeh Khani-ye Sofla (also Romanized as Cheshmeh Khānī-ye Soflá; also known as Cheshmeh Khānī and Chashmeh Khānī) is a village in Khaveh-ye Jonubi Rural District, in the Central District of Delfan County, Lorestan Province, Iran. At the 2006 census, its population was 43, in 10 families.

References 

Towns and villages in Delfan County